Wayne Richardson (born 8 December 1946) is a former Australian rules footballer  in the (then) Victorian Football League.

Collingwood Football Club snared Wayne Richardson from South Fremantle Football Club in 1965 before he had made his senior debut and, not surprisingly, the West Australian side was extremely reluctant to clear him.  Richardson was forced to stand out of football for the entire 1965 season before his clearance was ratified, but as far as the Magpies were concerned, it was worth the wait, as he would develop into one of the finest players in the club's history.

A tough customer, and extremely skilful, he spent most of his 277-game, 323 goal VFL career between 1966 and 1978 as either a rover or ruck-rover, where his adeptness at reading the play enabled him to pick up countless possessions.  A Copeland Trophy winner in 1971 and 1974, Richardson captained the Magpies from midway through the 1971 season until 1975.  He represented the VFL on five occasions, and was universally acknowledged as one of the 'greats' of his era, a status emphasised by his inclusion in Collingwood's official 'Team of the Twentieth Century'.

Wayne's brother Max Richardson, played 211 games for Collingwood from 1969–1978, and another 30 for Fitzroy Football Club in 1979–1980. His son, Mark Richardson played 141 games for Collingwood from 1992–2002.

References

 Australian Football Hall of Fame

1946 births
Australian rules footballers from Western Australia
Collingwood Football Club players
South Fremantle Football Club players
Australian Football Hall of Fame inductees
Copeland Trophy winners
Living people